Otalampi is a village in Vihti municipality at the intersection of the Finnish national road 25 and the Vihti Road (Vihdintie). The population is about one thousand. Next to the village is a small lake called Otalampi, where the village got its name.

In 2008, the Otalampi House (Otalampi-talo) was completed in the village. The building houses a comprehensive school, a kindergarten and a maternity clinic at the same time. Also, the S-Market grocery store is located near the Otalampi House along the Vihti Road.

Notable people
 Elias Hellberg (1899–1956), engineer
 E. J. Vehmas (1902–1980), critic and assistant intendant of Ateneum

References

External links

 Otalampi - Official Web Site

Villages in Finland
Vihti